John Henry Shetzline (1852–1892) was a professional baseball player who primarily played third base in the American Association for the 1882 Baltimore Orioles.

External links

1852 births
1892 deaths
Baltimore Orioles (AA) players
Major League Baseball third basemen
Philadelphia Athletic players
Buffalo (minor league baseball) players
Philadelphia Athletics (minor league) players
Harrisburg (minor league baseball) players
Trenton (minor league baseball) players
Trenton Trentonians players
Long Island A's players
Providence Grays (minor league) players
Reading (minor league baseball) players
Wheeling (minor league baseball) players
Lancaster (minor league baseball) players
York (minor league baseball) players
Baseball players from Philadelphia
19th-century baseball players